Adam Warren may refer to:
 Adam Warren (comics) (born 1967), American comic book writer
 Adam Warren (baseball) (born 1987), Major League Baseball pitcher
 Adam Warren (cricketer) (born 1975), English cricketer
 Adam Warren (rugby union) (born 1991), Welsh rugby union player

See also
 Adam Warren Sketchbook